John Rogers II (died 1611/1612), of Canterbury, Kent, was an English politician. He is tentatively identified as a son of Richard Rogers.

Career
He was a Member of Parliament (MP) for Canterbury in 1601.

References

Year of birth missing
1610s deaths
People from Canterbury
English MPs 1601